The following table presents a listing of Ghana’s regional ministers as of April 2021.

Regional ministers

See also
List of Mahama Government Ministers
Regions of Ghana
List of Ghanaian regions by area
List of Ghanaian regions by population

References

Regional minister's
Ghanaian regional ministers
Lists of government ministers of Ghana